The 1996 World Weightlifting Championships were held in Warsaw, Poland from 3 May to 11 May. The women's competition in the +83 kilograms division was staged on 11 May.

Medalists

Records

Results

References
Results
Weightlifting Database

1996 World Weightlifting Championships
1996 in women's weightlifting